The 2013–14 Ekstraklasa (named T-Mobile Ekstraklasa for sponsorship reasons) was the 88th season of the Polish Football Championship, the 80th season of the highest tier domestic division in the Polish football league system since its establishment in 1927 and the 6th season of the Ekstraklasa under its current title. The league was operated by the Ekstraklasa SA.

A total of 16 teams were participating, 14 of which competed in the league during the 2012–13 season, while the remaining two were promoted from the I liga. Each team played a total of 30 matches, half at home and half away. After 30th round, league was split into 'champion' (top eight teams) and 'relegation' (bottom eight teams) groups. Each team played seven more games (1-4 and 9-12 teams played four times at home), starting with half the points achieved during the first phase of 30 matches. The changes extended the season to total of 296 matches played.

Legia Warsaw were the defending champions, winning their 9th title the previous season. Legia successfully defended their title.

Teams 
Promotion and relegation as usual was determined by the position in the table from prior season. The bottom two teams were directly relegated to the I Liga, while the top two teams are promoted to the Ekstraklasa.

Polonia Warsaw dissolved after the previous season. GKS Bełchatów finished 16th and were relegated to the Polish First League as a result. Zawisza Bydgoszcz and Cracovia finished 1st and 2nd, respectively, in the I Liga gained promotion. Cracovia returned to the top level at the first attempt, but Zawisza returned to it after 19 years.

Stadiums and locations

Personnel and kits

Regular season

League table

Results

Play-offs

Championship round

League table

Results

Relegation round

League table

Results

Season statistics

Top goalscorers

Top assists

Number of teams by Voivodeship

References

External links 
 

Ekstraklasa seasons
Poland
1